Alejandro Javier Rabell (born November 12, 2001) is a Puerto Rican international footballer who currently plays for NJIT Highlanders in the NCAA D1 and the Puerto Rico national football team.

Career
Rabell has played club soccer in Puerto Rico and also in the United States and Spain. He has played for The Baldwin School of Puerto Rico were he also studied. He also played for Lonestar SC of the U.S. Soccer Development Academy before moving to Barcelona where he played for Marcet where he faced teams such as Sevilla FC and Mallorca.

He made his senior debut with Bayamón FC in 2016, but played full time in the 2018-19 season where he managed to score 19 goals in the Liga Puerto Rico and 4 in the Copa Luis Villarejo for a total of 23 goals..

He joined NCAA D1 side NJIT Highlanders where he scored a goal and assisted on his debut.

International
In 2016 Rabell was called up to the Puerto Rico U17 national team where he earned 3 caps playing the first round of the World Cup Qualifiers. In 2018, Rabell trained with both Senior and U20 national teams. He played 5 games with Puerto Rico U20 at the 2018 Concacaf Championship at IMG Academy where he also scored 3 goals.

In November 16, 2018, Rabell made his debut with the Puerto Rico national football team where he started in the match against Belize in the CONCACAF Nations League qualifying.

In February 2020, he was called up for his second time with the Puerto Rico U-20 national football team for the first round of World Cup Qualification.

References

External links

2001 births
Living people
Puerto Rican footballers
Puerto Rico international footballers
Bayamón FC players
NJIT Highlanders men's soccer players
Association football midfielders
Puerto Rico youth international footballers